Day of Wrath is a 1985 Soviet science fiction horror film directed by Sulambek Mamilov.

Plot
Journalist Betli (Juozas Budraitis) is investigating a mysterious zone in which people become lost and strange events occur. He is met by the forester Meller (Aleksei Petrenko), who tells that in the forest there used to be a laboratory in which the scientist-geneticist Fiedler (Anatoly Ivanov) conducted experiments. As a result of genetic experiments, Fiedler created a new race of bear-like creatures, but with human intellect and called them otarks. But unlike people, otarks have no emotions or universal morals. They catch people and carry out their own experiments on them which leads to the inhabitants of the villages surrounding the forest being afraid of them. The forester catches and kills the otarks, but in the end both him and Betli are killed. Betli has time to record the whole story on camera, heard from otarks and from Meller, and calls the scientist to trial. After the death of the journalist, the villagers arm themselves and destroy the otarks, hereby causing the Day of Wrath.

Cast
Juozas Budraitis — journalist Betli
Aleksei Petrenko — forester Meller
Anatoly Ivanov — Fiedler
Vladimir Ivashov — Caste
Evgeni Dvorzhetsky — unkempt man
Pavel Makhotin — chairman of the commission
Paul Butkevich — member of the government commission
Svetlana Svetlichnaya — a woman from ruins
Grazhyna Baikshtite — Betli's wife
Konstantin Zakharchenko — Stenglik
Marina Fominova — Stenglik's wife
Mariana Polteva — Tina

References

External links
 

Soviet science fiction horror films
1980s science fiction horror films
Gorky Film Studio films
1985 films
1980s Russian-language films